Étienne Gustave Frédéric, 3rd Baron van Zuylen van Nyevelt van de Haar (16 October 1860 – 8 May 1934), was a Dutch-Belgian banker, businessman, philanthropist, equestrian and car enthusiast. He was a founding member of the Automobile Club de France, serving as the organisation's first president, and was the first president of the Association Internationale des Automobile Clubs Reconnus (AIACR, later known as the FIA).

Personal life
Van Zuylen was born in Saint-Étienne, near Nice, on 16 October 1860, a member of the old Dutch Van Zuylen van Nievelt noble family; he was the 3rd Baron van Zuylen van Nyevelt van de Haar. His father, Gustave, was a diplomat and his grandfather, Jean-Jacques was a former mayor of Bruges. On 16 August 1887, Van Zuylen married Hélène de Rothschild, daughter of Salomon James de Rothschild of the Rothschild banking family of France, in Paris. They had two sons, Egmont and Hélin. Hélin was killed in a car accident in 1912, and Egmont worked as a diplomat; his eldest child was Parisian socialite Marie-Hélène de Rothschild.

In 1890, Van Zuylen inherited the ruined De Haar Castle and set about restoring it. Financed by Rothschild money and directed by Dutch architect Pierre Cuypers, work started in 1892 and took 20 years.

Van Zuylen received recognition with appointments as an officer of the Legion of Honour, and as a knight of the Order of Leopold.

Van Zuylen died in Nice on 8 May 1934.

Cars and motorsport
With Jules-Albert de Dion and Paul Meyan, Van Zuylen was a founding member of the Automobile Club de France, and served as the organisation's first president between 1895 and 1922. He was also the first president of the Association Internationale des Automobile Clubs Reconnus (AIACR, English: 'International Association of Recognized Automobile Clubs'), later known as the Fédération Internationale de l'Automobile (FIA), holding the position from 1904 until his retirement in 1931.

Equestrian
Van Zuylen competed in the mail coach event at the 1900 Summer Olympics.

References

External links

1860 births
1934 deaths
Auto racing executives
Fédération Internationale de l'Automobile presidents
Belgian male equestrians
Olympic equestrians of Belgium
Equestrians at the 1900 Summer Olympics
Sportspeople from Nice
Barons of Belgium
Barons of the Netherlands
Officiers of the Légion d'honneur
Order of Leopold (Belgium)